The 2003 Liechtenstein local elections were held on 2 February to elect the municipal councils and the mayors of the eleven municipalities of Liechtenstein.

Electoral system
The municipal councils (German: Gemeinderat) are composed of an even number of councillors plus the mayor (German: Gemeindevorsteher). The number of councillors is determined by population count: 6 or 8 councillors for population 1,500, 8 or 10 councillors for population between 1,500 and 3,000, and 10 or 12 councillors for population over 3,000.

Councillors were elected in single multi-member districts, consisting of the municipality's territory, using an open list proportional representation system. Voting was on the basis of universal suffrage in a secret ballot.
The mayors were elected in a two-round system. If none of the candidates achieved a majority in the first round, a second round would have been held four weeks later, where the candidate with a plurality would be elected as a mayor.

Mayoral elections results

Summary

By municipality

Municipal council elections results

Summary

By municipality

References

External links
 Election results

2003
Liechtenstein
Local election
February 2003 events in Europe